The men's S9 100m Freestyle event at the 2018 Commonwealth Games was held on 6 April at the Gold Coast Aquatic Centre.

Schedule
The schedule is as follows:

All times are Australian Eastern Standard Time (UTC+10)

Records
Prior to this competition, the existing world, Commonwealth and Games records were as follows:

Results

Heats

Final

References

Men's 0100 metre freestyle S9
Commonwealth Games